The Douglas Adams Memorial Lecture is a lecture series held annually in honour of English author and screenwriter Douglas Adams. The lecture has been held every year since 2003 in support of environnemental charities, such as Save the Rhino International, with topics ranging from science, exploration, conservation and comedy. The event is traditionally held around Adams’ Birthday on 11th March and currently takes place at The Royal Geographical Society.

Douglas Adams Memorial Lecturer

References

2003 establishments in the United Kingdom
Lecture series